Cattini is a surname. Notable people with the surname include:

Clem Cattini (born 1937), English rock and roll drummer
Ferdinand Cattini (1916–1969), Swiss ice hockey player, brother of Hans
Hans Cattini (1914–1987), Swiss ice hockey player

See also
Cattani
Tattini